Marcio Alvarado, better known by his stage name Alvin Risk, is an American electronic music producer, singer and DJ from Washington, D.C., United States. He has released music on Owsla, Dim Mak, and Ministry of Sound. He has also released under the label Memory LTD. Risk is the brother of Painted Face, singer and producer Allie Alvarado. Alvin Risk was on the radio show DVDASA on January 15, 2014.

Career
Risk was a founding member of the band Corrupt Souls, a drum and bass group from Washington D.C., United States which was active from 2004 to 2007. The members were Telemetrik (Marcio Alvarado) and Impulse (Josh Clark).

Corrupt Souls have released material on Ohm Resistance (Submerged's record label), Renegade Hardware, Moving Shadow, and Black Sun Empire's record label. They are also credited on the project by Bill Laswell and Robert Soares, Method of Defiance - Inamorata. The band is connected to Submerged.

Discography

Extended plays

Singles

Other appearances

Production credits

Remixes

References

External links
Official website

Year of birth missing (living people)
Living people
Remixers
Record producers from Washington, D.C.
Musicians from Washington, D.C.
Owsla artists